Hong Kong Sceneway Plaza , SCENEWAY PLAZA is a shopping centre in Lam Tin, Kowloon, Hong Kong. It also contains the East Kowloon Office of the Immigration Department. Opened in February 1992, the shopping centre is located adjacent to Lam Tin station of Hong Kong's Mass Transit Railway (MTR). The plaza, which used to be a Japanese department store called Yaohan, contains many small stores including fashion, stationery, and music shops.

The complex has five floors, but only three are used for multiple retail outlets. One floor contains the offices of the Immigration Department and the bottom floor has only a bookstore (in addition to the escalator).

Dining
Several Chinese tea restaurants are located near the public apartments in Lam Tin, and private estates are situated near Sceneway Plaza, resulting in a large number of dining establishments that range from cantonese restaurants to McDonald's. In addition, several unlicensed shops that serve cold noodles have opened. They had been monitored by the Food and Environmental Hygiene Department, but their low prices attracted a large number of students who tended to litter Sceneway Plaza with packaging materials, causing environmental problems. Yoshinoya opened in July 2006.

In July 2006, the Shanghainese restaurant was closed permanently. In August 2006, a Fairwood fast-food restaurant opened in its place.

In June 2010, Mr Cake, a cake and dessert specialist, opened on the fifth floor. They serve Hokkaido chiffon cakes, serradura, mango puddings, Taiwanese egg cakes and other desserts. Many of its products are unique to Sceneway Plaza and its surrounding area.

Shops
Sceneway Plaza shops include the PARKnSHOP shopping center on the fourth floor.

Public transport
Sceneway Plaza's main public transport is MTR and buses that pass the Eastern Harbour Crossing to most places in Kowloon and Hong Kong Island.

See also

Sceneway Garden

Shopping centres in Hong Kong
1991 establishments in Hong Kong
Lam Tin
CK Hutchison Holdings